The II National Assembly of Venezuela was a meeting of the legislative branch of Venezuelan federal government, comprising the National Assembly of Venezuela. It met in Caracas after 2005 Venezuelan parliamentary election.

Leadership

Parties 
Updated on October 5, 2010.

Color codes

Members

See also 

 I National Assembly of Venezuela
 III National Assembly of Venezuela
 IV National Assembly of Venezuela

References

National Assembly (Venezuela)